Advanced Energy Economy (AEE) is a national trade association representing the advanced energy industry. In 2021, AEE reported over 100 member companies. 

AEE states that it is the only industry association in the U.S. that represents the full range of advanced energy technologies and services, both grid-scale and distributed. AEE's stated mission is to transform public policy to enable rapid growth of advanced energy businesses. AEE defines advanced energy technologies and services as included energy efficiency, demand response, energy storage, solar, wind, hydro, nuclear, electric vehicle, biofuels and smart grid. 

AEE is associated with Advanced Energy Economy Institute, a 501 (c)(3) nonprofit organization. In Texas, AEE operates as the Texas Advanced Energy Business Alliance. AEE is the developer of PowerSuite, a software platform that enables users to search, track, and collaborate on energy policy.

Founding 

AEE was founded in 2011 by Tom Steyer, an American asset manager and philanthropist, and Hemant Taneja, an Indian-born American venture capitalist. George P. Shultz, an American economist, statesman, and businessman, was also instrumental in AEE's creation. In 2011, Graham Richard, an American politician and entrepreneur, was named CEO of the group. In 2018, Nat Kreamer became CEO of AEE. An entrepreneur and investor, Kreamer was previously president and CEO of Spruce Finance and its predecessor Clean Power Finance, as well as co-founder, president, and COO of rooftop solar company SunRun.

Today, AEE's board of directors include executives from Apex Clean Energy, CLEAResult, Enel X North America, Landis+Gyr, LS Power, Microsoft, Modern Energy, Pattern Energy, Schneider Electric, and TRC Companies.

Publications 

AEE commissions and publishes reports and other publications to educate policymakers and the public about the industry. These include This Is Advanced Energy, a catalogue of technologies and services, and Advanced Energy Now Market Report, which quantifies U.S. and global advanced energy revenue. AEE also issues annual fact sheets on advanced energy employment in the United States and in several states. 

Other AEE reports highlight economic opportunities associated with advanced energy investment and growth. These include Electrifying California: Economic Potential of Growing Electric Transportation and Opportunities for Meeting Commercial & Industrial Demand for Renewable Energy in Indiana.

State Engagement 

Advanced Energy Economy provides information to governors, legislators, and Public Utility Commissioners (PUCs) on advanced energy technologies for consumers and the grid. AEE also works with environmental, labor, and justice groups at the state level in support of policies that promote the adoption of advanced energy and remove legislative and regulatory barriers to advanced energy. 

 In 2020, AEE was involved in efforts to pass the Virginia Clean Economy Act, which was signed into law by Governor Ralph Northam. The Act mandates that Virginia will have 100% clean electricity by 2045.
 Advanced Energy Economy's influence in California led to Governor Gavin Newsom's executive order to phase out sale of internal combustion engine vehicles by 2035.
 The organization worked with Arizona Public Service Co. (APS) on a plan for the utility to achieve 100% clean energy.
 Advanced Energy Economy raised $701 million in New York for electric vehicle infrastructure programs through regulatory engagement.
 Texas Advanced Energy Business Alliance worked with Public Utility Commission of Texas to open proceedings on electrifying transportation.

Federal and Wholesale Market Engagement 
AEE has been engaged with the Federal Energy Regulatory Commission (FERC) and has testified before Congress around stimulus for the advanced energy industry and the impact it has on the COVID-19 economic recovery. 

Advanced Energy Economy filed in support of maintaining FERC Order 841 requiring that regional grid operators allow energy storage to compete in their wholesale markets.

Board of directors 

As of 2021, AEE's Board of Directors include:

Len Diplock, Senior Vice President, Corporate Development and Strategy, CLEAResult
Mike Garland, President and CEO, Pattern Energy
 Nathan Hanson, Senior Vice President, Energy and Commercial Management, LS Power
 Mark Laabs, CEO, Modern Energy
 Ed Myszka, PowerSector President, TRC Companies
 Surya Panditi, CEO, Enel X North America
 Michelle Patron, Director of Sustainability Policy, Microsoft
 Eamon Perrel, Senior Vice President of Business Development, Apex Clean Energy
 Kevin Self, SVP Strategy, Business Development & Government Relations, Schneider Electric
 Prasanna Venkatesan, President and CEO Americas, Landis+Gyr Inc.

References 

Trade associations based in the United States